Peter van der Kwaak (born 12 October 1968) is a Dutch footballer who played in The Football League for Carlisle United and Reading.

References

1968 births
Living people
Dutch footballers
Van Der Kwaak, Peter
Van Der Kwaak, Peter
Van Der Kwaak, Peter
Footballers from Haarlem
Association football goalkeepers